Antin may refer to:

Places
 Antin, Hautes-Pyrénées, a commune in the Hautes-Pyrénées department in France
 Antin, Croatia, a village in eastern Croatia

People

Surname
 Benjamin Antin (1884–1956), New York politician
 Eleanor Antin (born 1935), American artist and writer
 Mary Antin (1881–1949), American author and activist

Given name
Ukrainian form of Anton (given name)
 Antin Angelovych, Ukrainian cleric
 Antin Holovaty, Ukrainian Cossack leader
 Antin Paplynsky, Ukrainian bandura maker
 Antin Sielava, Ukrainian cleric

Companies
 Antin Infrastructure Partners, private equity firm